Rear-Admiral Derek James Anthony  (2 November 1947 − 19 March 2019) was a Royal Navy officer who became Flag Officer Scotland, Northern England and Northern Ireland.

Naval career
Anthony joined the Royal Navy in 1966. After qualifying as a submariner and being given command of the submarines HMS Onslaught and then HMS Warspite, he became captain of the frigate HMS Cumberland in 1991. He was appointed Director of Naval Service Conditions at the Ministry of Defence in 1993; Deputy Flag Officer Submarines in 1996; and, naval attaché in Washington D. C. in 1997, before becoming Flag Officer, Scotland, Northern England and Northern Ireland in 2000 and retiring in 2003.

In retirement, he became Clerk of the Worshipful Company of Shipwrights.

Family
He was married to Denyse and had two married daughters. He died on 19 March 2019, aged 71.

References

1947 births
2019 deaths
Royal Navy rear admirals
Royal Navy submarine commanders
Members of the Order of the British Empire